Hypatopa fio is a moth in the family Blastobasidae. It is found in Costa Rica, especially in western Cordillera de Guanacaste.

Description 
The species is noted to be similar to H. erato in regards to its facial features, but it differs in that it has a longer uncus and other similar differences.

The length of the fore wings is about 4.7 mm. The fore wings are pale brown intermixed with brown scales. The hind wings are a translucent pale brown and gradually darken towards the apex of the moth. Its head has pale greyish-brown scales.

Etymology
The specific name is derived from Latin fio, meaning to come into existence.

References

Moths described in 2013
Hypatopa